Axel Sandin-Pellikka (born 11 March 2005) is a Swedish professional ice hockey defenceman currently playing for the Skellefteå AIK in the Swedish Hockey League (SHL). He is considered a top prospect for the 2023 NHL Entry Draft and one of the top defenseman in the draft.

Playing career
Sandin-Pellikka plays for Skellefteå AIK and has played for Team Sweden in the World Juniors.

Career statistics

Regular season and playoffs

International

References

External links
 

2005 births
Living people
People from Gällivare Municipality
Skellefteå AIK players
Sportspeople from Norrbotten County